Xavier Quentin Shay Simons (born 21 April 2003) is a Dutch professional footballer who plays as a midfielder or an attacking midfielder for Eredivisie club PSV and the Netherlands national team.

Early life
Born in Amsterdam, Simons is the son of Dutch former footballer Regillio Simons. Simons is of Surinamese descent through his father. His older brother Faustino (born 1996), who also played football, shares the same birthday.

Club career

Early career

Paris Saint-Germain

In July 2019, Simons moved to French side Paris Saint-Germain (PSG), having failed to agree a new contract with Barcelona. His three-year contract with the Parisian club was reportedly worth up to €1 million annually. On 10 February 2021, Simons made his professional debut for PSG, coming on as a substitute for Julian Draxler in a 1–0 Coupe de France win over Caen. He made his Ligue 1 debut as a substitute in a 4–1 win over Strasbourg two months later. On 19 May 2021, he won his first professional trophy, the Coupe de France.

Ahead of the 2021–22 season, Simons was included in the first-team preparation and pre-season by manager Mauricio Pochettino. On 14 July 2021, he came off the bench and scored a goal in a 4–0 friendly win over Le Mans at the Camp des Loges. He scored another goal in a 2–2 friendly draw against Chambly three days later at the same ground. On 18 August, Simons was sent back to train with the under-19 squad coached by Zoumana Camara. He eventually made his first appearance of the season for PSG in a 3–0 cup win over Feignies Aulnoye on 19 December, his first ever professional start. On 3 January 2022, Simons recorded his first senior assist in a 4–0 cup win over Vannes, a pass for Kylian Mbappé. His first league appearance of the 2021–22 season came in a 1–1 away draw to Lyon on 9 January, where he came on as a 69th minute substitute. On 31 January, Simons missed the final penalty in a 6–5 penalty shoot-out defeat to Nice in the round of 16 of the Coupe de France. On 11 February, he made his first league start in a 1–0 win over Rennes at the Parc des Princes.

PSV 
On 28 June 2022, Simons signed for Eredivisie club PSV on a five-year contract. Although he was initially expected to extend his contract with PSG and join PSV on loan, the situation changed when PSV no longer wanted a loan deal. However, PSG negotiated a buy-back clause in Simons's contract, effective in 2023. Simons scored a goal on his debut for the club, a 5–3 win over rivals Ajax in the Johan Cruyff Shield on 30 July. On 7 August, in his first Eredivisie game, Simons provided an assist for Johan Bakayoko, who opened the scoring in a 4–1 victory against newly promoted Emmen.

International career
Simons has represented the Netherlands at under-15, under-16, under-17, and under-19 and under-21 levels.

On 21 October 2022, Simons joined the preselection of the Dutch national team for the first time in his career. A few weeks later, he was eventually called up for the World Cup in Qatar by head coach Louis van Gaal. On 3 December he made his World Cup debut against the United States with a 3-1 win, in the round of 16.

Personal life
In March 2020, Simons was named on Goal's "NxGn 2020" list of 50 best wonderkids in world football. He was also included in The Guardian's "Next Generation 2020" in October. Simons has amassed a large following on social media platform Instagram, with over 4 million followers. He also has a sponsorship contract with sporting goods manufacturer Adidas.

Career statistics

Club

International

Honours 
Paris Saint-Germain
 Ligue 1: 2021–22
 Coupe de France: 2020–21

PSV
 Johan Cruyff Shield: 2022
Individual

 Eredivisie Player of the Month: August 2022
 Eredivisie Talent of the Month: January 2023

References

External links

Profile at the PSV Eindhoven website

2003 births
Living people
Footballers from Amsterdam
Dutch footballers
Spanish footballers
Dutch sportspeople of Surinamese descent
Spanish people of Dutch descent
Spanish people of Surinamese descent
Association football midfielders
Netherlands youth international footballers
Netherlands international footballers
FC Barcelona players
Paris Saint-Germain F.C. players
PSV Eindhoven players
Ligue 1 players
Eredivisie players
2022 FIFA World Cup players
Spanish expatriate footballers
Dutch expatriate footballers
Expatriate footballers in France
Dutch expatriate sportspeople in France
Spanish expatriate sportspeople in France